Morning Sun is a city in Morning Sun Township, Louisa County, Iowa, United States. The population was 752 at the time of the 2020 census. It is part of the Muscatine Micropolitan Statistical Area.

History
Morning Sun was laid out in 1851 by Cicero Hamilton.

Geography
Morning Sun is located on the north side of Iowa Highway 78 approximately 1.5 miles north of the Louisa-Des Moines county line. Wapello is about six miles north.

Demographics

2010 census
As of the census of 2010, there were 836 people, 314 households, and 220 families living in the city. The racial makeup of the city was 98.3% White, 0.5% African American, 0.1% Native American, 0.1% from other races, and 1.0% from two or more races. Hispanic or Latino of any race were 1.6% of the population.

There were 314 households, of which 32.2% had children under the age of 18 living with them, 54.1% were married couples living together, 11.5% had a female householder with no husband present, 4.5% had a male householder with no wife present, and 29.9% were non-families. 26.1% of all households were made up of individuals, and 15.3% had someone living alone who was 65 years of age or older. The average household size was 2.54 and the average family size was 3.04.

The median age in the city was 39.8 years. 25.7% of residents were under the age of 18; 5.5% were between the ages of 18 and 24; 24.1% were from 25 to 44; 25.7% were from 45 to 64; and 18.9% were 65 years of age or older. The gender makeup of the city was 49.5% male and 50.5% female.

2000 census
As of the census of 2000, there were 872 people, 338 households, and 239 families living in the city. The racial makeup of the city was 97.36% White, 0.11% African American, 0.46% Native American, 0.46% Asian, 1.38% from other races, and 0.23% from two or more races. Hispanic or Latino of any race were 3.78% of the population.

There were 338 households, out of which 31.1% had children under the age of 18 living with them, 58.3% were married couples living together, 10.1% had a female householder with no husband present, and 29.0% were non-families. 25.4% of all households were made up of individuals, and 15.7% had someone living alone who was 65 years of age or older. The average household size was 2.46 and the average family size was 2.90.

In the city, the population was spread out, with 25.6% under the age of 18, 6.5% from 18 to 24, 28.1% from 25 to 44, 19.7% from 45 to 64, and 20.1% who were 65 years of age or older. The median age was 38 years. For every 100 females, there were 87.9 males. For every 100 females age 18 and over, there were 84.9 males.

The median income for a household in the city was $37,727, and the median income for a family was $43,173. Males had a median income of $32,107 versus $20,313 for females. The per capita income for the city was $19,041. About 8.3% of families and 12.2% of the population were below the poverty line, including 18.4% of those under age 18 and 9.3% of those age 65 or over.

Notable people

 Jack Hamilton, Major League Baseball Player
 Clifford Roberts, co-founder with Bobby Jones of the Augusta National Golf Club and Chairman of the Masters Tournament from 1934 through 1976

References

Cities in Iowa
Cities in Louisa County, Iowa
Muscatine, Iowa micropolitan area